Flute Fever is the debut album by American jazz flautist Jeremy Steig released on the Columbia label in 1964.

Reception 

In an All About Jazz review, Dan McLenaghan commented: "It's a blowing session—no group rehearsal, just some brief pre-recording discussions about how to approach some familiar tunes. But man, what a blowing session ... one of the finest jazz flute recordings to be found".

Track listing
 "Oleo" (Sonny Rollins) – 5:19
 "Lover Man" (Jimmy Davis, Ram Ramirez, Jimmy Sherman) – 9:04
 "What Is This Thing Called Love?" (Cole Porter) – 3:53
 "So What" (Miles Davis) – 10:37
 "Well, You Needn't" (Thelonious Monk) – 4:17
 "Willow Weep for Me" (Ann Ronell) – 5:15
 "Blue Seven" (Rollins) – 11:09
 "What Is This Thing Called Love?" [Take 1] (Porter) – 3:17 Additional track on CD reissue

Personnel
Jeremy Steig – flute
Denny Zeitlin – piano
Ben Tucker − bass 
Ben Riley – drums

References

Columbia Records albums
Jeremy Steig albums
1964 albums
Albums produced by John Hammond (producer)